Shyam Nagar is an area of Budaun city in Uttar Pradesh, India.

Location
It's located on the SH33 Bareilly Road at the end of the city, and Budaun Old Bypass also passes through it. The nearest bus stop is Navada Chowk, 200 m away, nearest bus stand is Aonla Bus Stand 500 m away, Budaun Roadways Bus Stand 2.5 km away and Budaun Railway Station is 3.5 km away.

See also
Budaun

References

Budaun
Neighbourhoods in Uttar Pradesh